Jesus Christ Bobby is an album by the Icelandic band Mínus. It was recorded and produced in October 2000 by Curver in Studio Rusl and at Frosti's bedroom. Mixed by Ken Thomas at Thule Studios.  This marked the last album written by the band playing a Noise Rock/Hardcore influenced sound, before changing style drastically for follow-up album Halldor Laxness.

Track listing
All songs written and performed by Mínus and a noisy help from Curver. Special guest vocals on "Modern Haircuts" by Einar Örn. "Bonus Track" is every song on the album played in reverse at the same time. "Arctic Exhibition" is the only track whose lyrics cannot be found in the cd booklet.

 "Chimera" - 2:24
 "Leisure" - 2:24
 "Modern Haircuts" - 3:39
 "Misdo" - 3:22
 "Electra Complex" - 2:52 
 "Frat Rock" - 4:50
 "Arctic Exhibition" - 3:52 
 "Liquid Courage" - 4:01 
 "Denver" - 3:08 
 "Peccadillo" - 2:54 
 "Pulse" 5:20
 "Bonus Track" - 5:20

Personnel
Krummi	 - 	Vocals
Frosti	 - 	Guitar
Bjarni	 - 	Guitar
Bjössi	 - 	Drums
Ívar	 - 	Bass

References

Mínus albums
2000 albums